Big Game is a 2014 action-adventure film directed by Jalmari Helander and written by Helander and Petri Jokiranta. The film stars Samuel L. Jackson, Onni Tommila, Ray Stevenson, Victor Garber, Mehmet Kurtulus, Ted Levine, Felicity Huffman, and Jim Broadbent. It is one of the most expensive Finnish films.

Premiering at the 2014 Toronto International Film Festival, the film was generally well received, with IGN calling it "a throwback to '80s and '90s adventure movie with a dash of comic book violence thrown in for good measure."

Plot

Air Force One is shot down by terrorists, leaving William Alan Moore, the President of the United States, stranded in the wilderness of Finland. In the forest on a hunting mission to prove his maturity to his kinsfolk, a 13-year-old boy named Oskari plans to track down a deer, only to discover an escape pod that holds Moore. The pair must team up to escape the terrorists who are closing in to capture their own "Big Game" prize. Pentagon officials, including the Vice President, the CIA director, and former CIA field operative Herbert who has been brought in as a consultant, monitor the events through satellite broadcast.

Already feeling at a disadvantage as a hunter due to his father's reputation—he having hunted and defeated a bear on his own hunt—Oskari's faith is further shattered when he follows a map his father left him, eventually finding a portable refrigeration unit with a pre-killed deer head in it. Moore boosts Oskari's confidence by reminding him with his goal. They are subsequently confronted by a corrupt United States Secret Service agent Morris, who orchestrated the attack from aboard Air Force One after sustaining a bullet-wound that left a fragment of shrapnel near his heart, and a mercenary named Hazar. Although he puts Moore in the refrigeration unit and take him home to kill, Oskari regains his confidence by leaping onto it before the helicopter can carry away. Oskari drops the unit to a river.

Discovering that the river leads to the lake where Air Force One crashed, Moore and Oskari swim inside the plane to wait for rescue. Hazar attacks them, sets a time bomb, and orders to kill the President rather than torture him for later execution. Moore kills Hazar before he and Oskari escape Air Force One via the ejector seats. Oskari shoots Morris with an arrow as the former bodyguard leans out of a helicopter to kill them. The arrow fails to penetrate the protective padding on Morris's chest, dislodging the shrapnel inside him to impale his heart. As Morris plummets, Air Force One explodes itself, destroying his helicopter and sending Moore and Oskari flying all the way back to the camp where the Navy SEAL team simultaneously arrives to search for Moore. With his acting as Oskari's 'prize', Moore assures Oskari's father that his son is the bravest man he has ever met. Oskari receives the Medal of Honor for saving Moore's life.

During a private discussion in the bathroom at the Pentagon, the Vice President and Herbert discover that Hazar was originally a CIA operative. His plan would have the President killed to inspire a new war on terror, but with his survival Moore becomes a hero instead. To ensure that nothing can be traced back to them, Herbert kills the Vice President by shoving him back against the sink.

Cast
 Samuel L. Jackson as William Alan Moore, President of the United States
 Onni Tommila as Oskari
 Felicity Huffman as Director of the Central Intelligence Agency
 Victor Garber as Vice President of the United States
 Ted Levine as General Underwood
 Jim Broadbent as Fred Herbert, a former CIA operative, advisor and head of the Terrorist Intel Unit.
 Ray Stevenson as Morris
 Mehmet Kurtuluş as Hazar, a former CIA operative posing as a freelance terrorist.

Production
The film's budget was €8.5 million (equivalent to US$10 million at the time), making it the most expensive film ever produced in Finland to that day.  Although the wilderness adventures are portrayed to take place in Finnish Lapland, the outdoor footage in the film was filmed in the Alps and the rest were filmed in Germany.

Reception

Box office
Big Game opened in Finland on 19 March 2015 at number 4, taking in $324,321 from 113 screens. The following week it dropped 38% to finish the weekend at number 2, with $199,996 from 103 screens. The film had made $1,420,000 (€1,271,847) as of 26 June 2015.

As of 17 May 2015, the film had a worldwide total of $7,455,218.

Critical response
On Rotten Tomatoes, the film has a 78% approval rating, based on reviews from 88 critics, the critics consensus states "Big Game's enthusiastic throwback vibe will appeal to fans of low-budget '80s action movies, but co-writer/director Jalmari Helander adds a level of smarts and skill that make it more than just an homage." On Metacritic, the film has a weighted average score of 53 out of 100, based on reviews from 18 critics, indicating "mixed or average reviews".

The Hollywood Reporter called it "A Presidential rescue tale that's ludicrous, in a good way." IGN called it "Goonies with guns".

Accolades
Big Game received a nomination for Best DVD or Blu-ray Release at the 42nd Saturn Awards.

References

External links
 
 
 
 

2014 films
Finnish action adventure films
Finnish aviation films
American action adventure films
American aviation films
English films
British action adventure films
German action adventure films
2010s English-language films
English-language Finnish films
English-language German films
2010s Finnish-language films
2010s action adventure films
Films about fictional presidents of the United States
Films about terrorism in Europe
Films directed by Jalmari Helander
Films set in Finland
Films set in Lapland
Films set in the United States
Films set in Washington, D.C.
Films shot in Germany
British aviation films
Relativity Media films
EuropaCorp films
German aviation films
Films about Air Force One
2014 multilingual films
Finnish multilingual films
American multilingual films
British multilingual films
German multilingual films
2010s American films
2010s British films
2010s German films